Malyutin is a Russian masculine surname, its feminine counterpart is Malyutina. Notable people with the surname include:

Maxim Malyutin (born 1988), Belarusian ice hockey goaltender
Sergey Malyutin (1859–1937), Russian painter, architect and stage designer